George Lucas (7 January 1901 – 7 April 1995) was an  Australian rules footballer who played with St Kilda in the Victorian Football League (VFL).

Notes

External links 

1901 births
1995 deaths
Australian rules footballers from Tasmania
St Kilda Football Club players
Prahran Football Club players
Prahran Football Club coaches